Glenfair is a small neighborhood spanning the Northeast and Southeast sections of Portland, Oregon, on the city's eastern border with Gresham. It is bordered by the Wilkes, Hazelwood, and Centennial neighborhoods in Portland, as well as the City of Gresham to the east. Its boundaries are NE Glisan Street, 148th Avenue, SE Stark, and 161st Street. 

The neighborhood's major attraction is Glenfair Park. The Glenfair Community Garden exists on 143rd Avenue and E Burnside.

In late 1978, United Airlines Flight 173, a DC-8 arriving from New York and Denver, crash-landed at Burnside and 157th after running out of fuel while attempting to rectify a landing gear issue. Ten on board were killed with no casualties on the ground.

Glenfair is home to the largest Hispanic population of Portland, making up 31.4% of the population.

References

External links
 Guide to Glenfair Neighborhood (PortlandNeighborhood.com)

Neighborhoods in Portland, Oregon